Northern English may refer to:

 People from Northern England
 Northern England English, English language in Northern England
 Northern American English, English language in Northern United States
 A historical term for Northumbria or area governed by the Viking-Age rulers of Bamburgh

See also
 Southern English (disambiguation)
 Northern American English (disambiguation)